Douglas Carlyle Cameron (born March 22, 1957) is an American engineer, inventor, and investor. He is a senior managing director for the U.S.-China Green Fund. He is on the board of the Foundation for Food and Agriculture Research (FFAR) and is a technical and business advisor to organizations including the VTT (Finland), and the Center for Bioenergy Innovation (USA).

Early life and education
Cameron was born in Champaign, Illinois. The oldest of three brothers, he grew up in the Chicago suburb, Westchester, and graduated in 1975 from Proviso West High School, Hillside, Illinois.

Cameron graduated from Duke University (1979) with a B.S.E. in Biomedical Engineering. In May 1979 he joined Advanced Harvesting Systems, a start-up company focused on large-scale plant protein purification, as the first non-founding member of the company.

He was married in August 1979 to Sally Jo Clark.

Cameron started graduate school at the Massachusetts Institute of Technology in July 1981 and graduated with a Ph.D. in biochemical engineering in December 1986. His Ph.D. advisor was Charles L. Cooney. His Ph.D. thesis was titled “The Production of R-1,2-Propanediol by Clostridium thermosaccharolyticum.”

Career
In December 1986, Cameron joined the Department of Chemical Engineering at the University of Wisconsin—Madison, as an assistant professor and advanced to full professor. The focus of his research was metabolic engineering (a field now more commonly known as synthetic biology) and industrial microbiology. One of his first projects was the engineering of the microbial pathway for 1,3-propanediol in Escherichia coli. This work was an early step in a process that was eventually commercialized by DuPont and Tate & Lyle. He is also the inventor of a process for the microbial production of 3-hydroxypropionic acid, which provides a bio-based route to industrial chemicals such as acrylic acid. In 1996 he did a sabbatical at the ETH Zurich (Switzerland) in the laboratory of James (Jay) E. Bailey. In 1998 he took a leave of absence to start the Biotechnology Development Center (BioTDC) at Cargill, Inc. in Minneapolis. In 2000 he officially left the University of Wisconsin.

Cameron was at Cargill, Inc. from 1998 to 2006, where he was Director of Biotechnology and chief scientist. While at Cargill he worked closely with NatureWorks on the development of a low-pH process for lactic acid as a feedstock for polylactic acid. He and his team also worked with Cargill Ventures on deal-sourcing and due-diligence.

In June 2006, Cameron moved from Cargill to join the newly formed Silicon Valley venture capital firm, Khosla Ventures, as chief scientific officer.

In 2008, Cameron returned to the Midwest to help Piper Jaffray build and grow its clean tech investment business. In 2010 he left Piper Jaffray to start Alberti Advisors, a technology and financial consulting business, and to begin raising a clean tech venture fund.

In 2011, Cameron and his partner, Tom Erickson, announced the formation of First Green Partners, a venture capital fund focused on early-stage investments in green technologies and environmentally-sound uses of fossil resources such as natural gas, backed by Warburg Pincus. The fund has two remaining portfolio companies, Trelys and Monolith Materials. Cameron is on the board of Trelys.

In 2017, Cameron joined the U.S.-China Green Fund, a China-based investment firm focused on addressing environmental problems in China. The U.S. office is in Chicago.

Awards and honors
Raphael Katzen Award, Society for Industrial Microbiology, 2009. Fellow, Class of 2008, American Society for the Advancement of Science (AAAS).  Featured profile, Nature Biotechnology, November 2007. Fellow, Society of Industrial Microbiology, 2003. College of Fellows, Class of 2001, American Institute of Medical and Biological Engineering (AIMBE).

U.S. Patents
 Polypeptides and biosynthetic pathways for the production of monatin and its precursors, U.S. Patent 9,034,610.
 Polypeptides and biosynthetic pathways for the production of monatin and its precursors, U.S. Patent 8,435,765.
 Polypeptides and biosynthetic pathways for the production of monatin and its precursors, U.S. Patent 8,372,989.
 Production of monatin and monatin precursors, U.S. Patent 8,206,955.
 Polypeptides and biosynthetic pathways for the production of monatin and its precursors. U.S. Patent 7,572,607.
 Production of 3-hydroxypropionic acid in recombinant organisms, U.S. Patent 6,852,517.
 Microbial production of 1,2-propanediol from sugar, U.S. Patent 6,303,352.
 Microbial production of 1,2-propanediol from sugar, U.S. Patent 6,087,140.
 Novel glycerol phosphatase with stereo-specific activity. U.S. Patent 5,733,749.
 Polysaccharide composition and process for preparing same. U.S. Patent 5,288,618.
 Galactomannan polysaccharide producing organism. U.S. Patent 5,130,249.

Publications

 
 
 
 
 
 
 
 
 
 
 
 
 
 
 

 
 Romich, M.S., D.C. Cameron, and M.R. Etzel. 1995. Three methods for large scale preservation of a microbial inoculum for bioremediation, in Bioaugementation for Site Remediation, R.E. Hinchee, J. Fredrickson and B.C. Alleman (eds.), Battelle Press, Columbus, MD.

References

American engineers
American inventors
American investors
Duke University Pratt School of Engineering alumni
MIT School of Engineering alumni
1957 births
Living people